Thomas Parry Garnier (22 February 1841 – 18 March 1898) was an English cleric. Also a first-class cricketer, he played as a right-handed batsman.

Early life
He was the second son of Thomas Garnier, educated at Twyford School and Winchester College. He matriculated Balliol College, Oxford, in 1859. In 1863 he graduated B.A., and became a Fellow of All Souls' College, until 1873. He graduated M.A. in 1866.

Cricketer

Garnier made his first-class debut for Oxford University Cricket Club in 1861 against the Marylebone Cricket Club. He represented Oxford University in nine first-class matches from 1861 to 1863, with his final first-class match for the University coming against Cambridge University; he was awarded a Blue in each of his three years in the Oxford team. In his nine matches for the University, Garnier scored 199 runs at an average of 15.30, with a highest score of 35.

Garnier represented the Gentlemen twice in 1861 in the Gentlemen v Players fixtures. Additionally, in 1862 he played for the Gentlemen of the North in a single first-class fixture against the Gentlemen of the South. His final first-class match came on his debut for Hampshire against Middlesex in Hampshire's first season of first-class cricket in 1864.

Later life
Garnier was ordained as a Church of England clergyman in 1866 and was successively vicar of South Hinksey, near Oxford, chaplain to the Bishop of London, and then rector in two Norfolk parishes, Cranworth and Banham. He was an opponent of church disestablishment at church congresses and wrote ecclesiastical histories.

Garnier died at St Moritz, Switzerland on 18 March 1898.

Family
Garnier's father, brother, nephew and uncle all played first-class cricket.

References

External links
Thomas Garnier at Cricinfo
Thomas Garnier at CricketArchive
Matches and detailed statistics for Thomas Garnier

1841 births
1898 deaths
People from Longford, Derbyshire
Cricketers from Derbyshire
English cricketers
Oxford University cricketers
Gentlemen cricketers
Hampshire cricketers
Gentlemen of the North cricketers
Alumni of Balliol College, Oxford
19th-century English Anglican priests